The Australian Production Car Championship is an Australian motor racing title for production cars, sanctioned by the Confederation of Australian Motor Sport (CAMS). The championship was first contested in 1987 and from 2008 to 2015 the title was awarded to the most successful driver in the annual Australian Manufacturers' Championship series which ran on the Shannons Nationals Motor Racing Championships program.

For 2016 the Australian Manufacturers' Championship (and thus the Australian Production Car Championship) was rebranded again as the Australian Production Car Series.

History

The title was first contested in 1987, with the inaugural champion determined from the results of two races held at the Winton Motor Raceway in Victoria on 27 September. The APCC was expanded to a series format in 1988. Changes to the Group 3E regulations in 1990 saw various cars including turbocharged and V8 powered models deemed ineligible for the championship from that year. In 1994 and 1995, competitors were restricted to using only front wheel drive cars of less than 2.5 litre capacity. The introduction in 1996 of the Australian GT Production Car Championship (which permitted GT type cars such as Porsche 911 and Ferrari F355) saw the APCC discontinued from that year.

Following the transfer of the GT cars to the new Australian Nations Cup Championship in 2000 and the relocation of other high performance models into a new Australian GT Performance Car Championship in 2003, the Australian GT Production Car Championship reverted to the Australian Production Car Championship name for the 2003 season.

For 2008, the cars from the Australian Performance Car Championship joined those from the Australian Production Car Championship to contest the Australian Manufacturers' Championship. with the Australian Production Car Championship title awarded to the highest scoring driver over the same series of races. This continued through to 2015.

For 2016 the Australian Manufacturers' Championship (and thus the Australian Production Car Championship) was replaced by the Australian Production Car Series.

Results

Australian Production Car Championship

Australian Production Car Series

Notes

References
Australian Auto Action, 9 October 1987
Australian Motor Racing Yearbook, 1987/88 to 1995
CAMS Manual of Motor Sport, 1987 to 2006

External links
PROCAR website (Archived on 14 February 2008) Retrieved on 18 August 2009

 
Production Car
1987 establishments in Australia
Sports leagues established in 1987